Hermann Hess Helfenstein (February 3, 1916 - October 14, 2008) was a Swiss naturalist, explorer, climber and engineer. He was member of the "Schweizer Alpen Club" (SAC in Switzerland) and "Deutscher Anden Verein" (DAV in Chile). He was notable for first ascents and exploration in Patagonia.

Career as naturalist, explorer and climber 
He was born in Engelberg, a mountain village in Switzerland, where his`parents ran a hotel. He began climbing with his father who was also a mountain guide.

In 1937, he emigrated to South America and in the South Andes Mountain Range he first climbed the Volcano Puntiagudo   with his partner R. Roth through the South Face.

Hermann Hess led three expeditions to Northern Patagonian Ice Field. Two of them were for geological purposes, started from the east and was sponsored by the Swiss Geologist A. Heim. The expedition from 1939/12/15 to 1940/1/16 was integrated by H. Hess, A. Heim, W. Schmitt, H. Moser and H. Neumayer. and the expedition from 1945/11/18 to 1945/12/31 was integrated by H.Hess, A. Heim, H. Smoll, A. Valmitjana and J. Studer. There he gave unknown and nameless summits a denomination, such as Cerro Cristal and Cerro Tronco climbing them for the first time.

Hermann Hess led and sponsored a 5-month expedition to the Northern Patagonian Ice Field from 1941/11/1 to 1942/3/1 starting at this time from the west with E. Hoffmann, J. Alig, G. Mani and the porter I. Vargas finding severe climatical and geographical difficulties.  In that decade he made also the successful first climb with R. Eggmann and J. Neumeyer to isolated Cerro Maca in 1944.

Return to Switzerland 
In 1950 he married Frida Schwabe in Puerto Varas. They had two children, German and Roland and in 1960 he returned to Switzerland. There he climbed the Mont Blanc, Weisshorn, Matterhorn, Eiger and Piz Palü.

He returned to Santiago, Capital of Chile, in 1963 and undertook the higher summits of the North Andes Mountain Range with members of DAV W. Foerster, F. Oestemer, H. Janko and other climbers until his death in 2008.

References 

1916 births
2008 deaths
People from Obwalden
Swiss naturalists
Swiss explorers
Swiss mountain climbers
20th-century naturalists
Swiss emigrants to Chile